Roald Dahl's Book of Ghost Stories (1983) is a collection of ghost stories chosen by Roald Dahl.

Dahl read 749 supernatural tales from an array of writers at the British Museum before choosing 14 that he considered the best. In the book Dahl writes; "Spookiness is, after all, the real purpose of the ghost story". He initially did this while working to develop an American television programme that would feature dramatisations of these stories. He wrote a pilot based on E. F. Benson's "The Hanging of Alfred Wadham", that was then filmed, but when producers saw the film they were concerned that it would offend American Catholics, due to the story being about the stipulations of confession. As a result, the show was cancelled, and years later Dahl decided to use his research to make a book.

Contents
W.S. (1952) by L.P. Hartley
Harry (1955) by Rosemary Timperley
The Corner Shop (1926) by Lady Cynthia Asquith
In the Tube (1922) by E.F. Benson
Christmas Meeting (1952) by Rosemary Timperley
Elias and the Draug (1902) by Jonas Lie
Playmates (1927) by A. M. Burrage
Ringing the Changes (1955) by Robert Aickman
The Telephone (1955) by Mary Treadgold
The Ghost of a Hand (1962) by Sheridan Le Fanu
The Sweeper (1931) by A. M. Burrage
Afterward (1910) by Edith Wharton
On the Brighton Road (1912) by Richard Barham Middleton
The Upper Berth (1885) by Francis Marion Crawford

References

1983 anthologies
Works by Roald Dahl
Jonathan Cape books
Ghost stories
Horror anthologies
Fantasy anthologies
Farrar, Straus and Giroux books